Chhaya Devi (3 June 1914 – 25 April 2001) was an Indian actress known for her work in Bengali and Hindi cinema. She appeared in hundreds of films for over five decades.

Her first lead role was in Debaki Bose's Bengali film Sonar Sansar (1936). She rose to hall of fame for her role as Rani Lakshmi in Debaki Bose's Vidyapati (1937). Some of her notable films are such as Nirjan Saikate (1963), Hatey Bazarey (1967) and Apanjan (1968) by Tapan Sinha, Saptapadi (1961),  Uttar Falguni  (1963), Antony Firingee (1967), in Bengali, Alaap (1977) in Hindi, which also starred Amitabh Bachchan.

Early life 
Chhaya Devi was born in Bhagalpur. Her father was Haradhan Gangopadhyay. She started her education in the Mokshda Girls High School in Adampur, Bhagalpur. Later her father was transferred to Delhi and she continued her education in the Indraprastha Girls School. She was married to Buddhadeb Chattopadhyay, a teacher at Ranchi, at the age of eleven. Her marriage did not last long and she came to Kolkata with her father when she was a student of tenth standard only. She was first cousin of actor Ashok Kumar's wife Shobha Ganguly, thus having relations to the Ganguly family also. However, though very little is known about her early life, her life is believed to be full of struggle. After she reached Kolkata she chose her career as an actress in films and stage, which she pursued for the next five decades.

Career 
Though Chhaya Devi debuted in Bengali movie Sonar Sansar in 1936, she acquired fame for the outstanding acting in the role of Queen Lakshmi in the movie Bidyapati in 1938. From lead female roles in her early days to character roles in her later years, Chhaya Devi had shown her creative ability in acting. 
In Atal Jaler Ahwan (1962), she stole the heart of the viewers with her soft and loving acting as surrogate mother of Soumitra. In Deya Neya (1963) she acted as the helpless mother of the aspirant singer Prashanta (Uttam Kumar). In the movie Saat Pake Badha (1963) she was the heartless, rude and indifferent mother of Suchitra Sen opposing the affair of her daughter with Soumitra. Chhaya Devi played the role of the mother of Uttam Kumar in many films. In Anthony Firingee (1967), Chhaya Devi was mother of Hensman Antony (Uttam Kumar). Apanjan, an outstanding film directed by Tapan Sinha in 1967, which won the National Film Award for Best Feature Film in Bengali, as well as several BFJA Awards, was considered having one of the best of the performances of Chhaya Devi.  In Podi Pisir Bormi Bakso (1972), a children's movie made from a story written by Leela Majumdar and directed by Arundhati Devi, Chhaya Devi played an unforgettable lead comic role of Podi Pisi, the widowed elderly aunt. Her last acted film was Tomar Rakte Amar Sohag, which was released in 1993, where she acted in a cameo role.

Awards
IFFI Best Actor Award (Female) (1965) for "Nirjan Saikate" at 3rd IFFI

Filmography

1930s

1936 Sonar Sansar - Roma
 
1936 Rajani - Maid Servant

1937 Bidyapati - Queen Laxmi
 
1937 Ranga Bou - Kalyani
 
1938 Bekar Nashan - Kamal 
 
1938 Hal Bangla - Sefali
 
1939 Bamanabatar - Sachi
 
1939 Jakher Dhan
 
1939 Debjani - Debjani
 
1939 Janak Nandini - Chandika 
 
1939 Rikta - Karuna

1940s
1940 Abhinetri
 
1940 Haar Jeet

1941 Sree Radha

1942 Jiban Sangini - Atar 
 
1942 Avayer Biye
 
1942 Chauranghee

1942 Mera Gaon

1945 Bondita

1946 Uttara Abhimanyu
 
1947 Burmar Pathey
 
1947 Jharer Par
 
1948 Dhatri Debata
 
1948 Anirban
 
1949 Abhijatya
 
1949 Kuasha

1950s
1950 Sree Tulsidas

1951 Ratnadeep

1956 Raat Bhore
 
1956 Shankar Narayan Bank
 
1956 Daner Maryada - Malati
 
1956 Saheb Bibi Golam- Bororani
 
1956 Subhalagna
 
1956 Trijama

1958 Bagha Jatin
 
1958 Marmabani

1959 Gali Theke Rajpath

1960s

1961 Pankatilak

1961 Manik
 
1961 Agni Sanskar

1962 Kancher Swarga
 
1962 Abasheshe

1962 Atal Jaler Ahwan - Anuradha Debi

1962 Rakta Palash
 
1963 Kanchan Kanya

1963 Deya Neya -the hero's mother 
  
1961 Saptapadi - Rina's Mother (Aayah)
 
1963 Nirjan Saikate
 
1963 Saat Pake Bandha - Archana's Mother
 
1963 Uttar Falguni - Baijee
 
1965 Mukhujey Paribar
 
1965 Antaral
 
1965 Arohi
 
1965 Kanch Kata Hirey
 
1965 Surya Tapa
 
1965 Thana Theke Aschi
 
1965 Tu Hi Meri Zindagi

1966 Galpo Holeo Satti - Bara Bou
 
1966 Mamta - Minabai

1967 Mahashweta
 
1967 Antony Firingee - Antony's Mother
 
1967 Hatey Bazarey - Nani
 
1968 Teen Adhaya
 
1968 Apanjan- Anandamoyee
 
1968 Baghini

1969 Arogya Niketan - Atar Bou
 
1969 Kamallata
 
1969 Pita Putra
 
1969 The Fiancée - Bhubaneswari
 
1969 Protidan

1970s
1970 Kalankita Nayak
 
1970 Rajkumari

1970 Muktisnan
 
1970 Samantaral

1971 Kuheli- Manodadi

1972 Har Mana Har

1972 Sesh Parba
 
1972 Padi Pishir Barmi Baksha - Aunt Padipishi
 
1972 Zindagi Zindagi
 
1974 Debi Chowdhurani - Brajeswar's mother
 
1974 Alor Thikana

1975 Swayamsiddha
 
1975 Harano Prapti Niruddesh
 
1975 Phool Sajya

1976 Harmonium
 
1976 Sei Chokh

1977 Kalpana

1977 Proxy
 
1977 Pratima
 
1977 Ae Prithibi Pantha Niwas
 
1977 Baba Taraknath
 
1977 Ek Je Chhilo Desh
 
1977 Babu Moshai
 
1977 Alaap - Sarju Bai Banaraswali 
 
1978 Dhanraj Tamang
 
1978 Nadi Theke Sagare

1979 Arun barun O Kironmala- The Jogini Maa

1980s
1981 Kalankini
 
1981 Subarnalata
 
1981 Manikchand
 
1981 Surya Sakhi
 
1982 Rajbadhu
 
1982 Pipasa
 
1983 Shinkhal
 
1983 Rang Birangi - Mrs. Bannerjee 
 
1983 Prayashchitta
 
1984 Rashifal
 
1984 Lal Golap
 
1984 Simantarag
 
1987 Swarnamoir Thikana
 
1987 Pratikar

1988 Boba Sanai

References

External links
 

Indian film actresses
1914 births
2001 deaths
Actresses in Bengali cinema
Actresses in Hindi cinema
Actresses from Kolkata
20th-century Indian actresses